Kristy Gazes (born October 28, 1967) is a professional poker player originally from California.

Gazes has been playing poker since 1986. She made a living for years as a high-stakes cash game player in Los Angeles, California.

Gazes preference for high-low split and mixed games such as H.O.R.S.E and H.O.S.E. has earned her the nickname "Mixed Games". She made the 2001 World Series of Poker S.H.O.E. final table. 

Her biggest career win came in 2005, when she took first place in the Full Tilt Poker Championship at the Wynn Las Vegas, besting a live televised final table that included Ted Forrest, Clonie Gowen and Daniel Negreanu. She took a $250,000 payout for her victory.  

In 2003, she won the World Championship of Online Poker Omaha high low split title. 

Gazes made multiple final tables during the first season of the Ultimate Poker Challenge and appeared as a guest commentator on that program. She appeared in the GSN series Poker Royale Battle of the Sexes.

In 2007, she made two final tables at the Aussie Millions, the Main Event and Pot Limit Omaha event, taking home over $230,000. 

In August 2007, she won the World Poker Tour Season Six Ladies Invitational.

As of 2016, her live tournament winnings exceed $1,040,000.

Kristy was formerly married to poker pro Bill Gazes.

In recent years, she has shifted her career focus from poker to the stock market and now owns a successful options trading business.

Notes

1967 births
American poker players
Female poker players
Living people
American derivatives traders